Reuilly may refer to the following communes in France:

Reuilly, Eure, in the Eure département
Reuilly, Indre, in the Indre département 
Reuilly-Sauvigny, in the Aisne département   
 
See also
12th arrondissement of Paris - also known as "Arrondissement de Reuilly"
Reuilly - Diderot (Paris Metro), a station on the Paris Metro.
Reuilly AOC, Wine